Woodstock is a town in Grafton County, New Hampshire, United States. The population was 1,434 at the 2020 census. Woodstock includes the village of North Woodstock, the commercial center. Its extensive land area is largely forested, and includes the Hubbard Brook Experimental Forest. Parts of the White Mountain National Forest are in the east and west. The Appalachian Trail crosses the town's northwest corner. Russell Pond Campground is in the east. West of North Woodstock is the Lost River Reservation.

History 

First granted in 1763, colonial Governor Benning Wentworth named the town "Peeling" after an English town. Many of the first colonists were originally from Lebanon, Connecticut. In 1771, his nephew, Governor John Wentworth, gave it the name "Fairfield", after Fairfield, Connecticut. The town was renamed "Woodstock" in 1840 for Blenheim Palace in Woodstock, Oxfordshire, England, possibly due to the popularity of the 1826 Walter Scott novel Woodstock.

Logging became a principal early industry, with sawmills established using water power from the Pemigewasset River. The entrance of the railroad in the 19th century opened the wilderness to development, carrying away wood products to market. It also brought tourists, many attracted by paintings of the region by White Mountain artists. Several inns and hotels were built to accommodate the wealthy, who sought relief from the summer heat, humidity and pollution of coal-age Boston, Hartford, New York and Philadelphia. They often relaxed by taking carriage rides through the White Mountains, or by hiking along the Lost River in Lost River Reservation. But with the advent of automobiles, patrons were no longer restricted by the limits of rail service. Consequently, many grand hotels established near depots declined and closed. North Woodstock, however, remains a popular tourist destination.

The Hubbard Brook Experimental Forest, an outdoor laboratory for ecological studies founded by the United States Forest Service in 1955, is located in the southern part of town.

Geography
Woodstock is drained by the Pemigewasset River, which crosses the eastern side of town. Tributaries of the Pemigewasset in Woodstock include Hubbard Brook, Glover Brook, Moosilauke Brook and its tributary the Lost River, and the East Branch Pemigewasset River.

Woodstock is crossed by Interstate 93, U.S. Route 3, New Hampshire Route 112 and New Hampshire Route 175.

Demographics

As of the census of 2010, there were 1,374 people, 624 households, and 353 families residing in the town. There were 1,421 housing units, of which 797, or 56.1%, were vacant. 701 of the vacant units were for seasonal or recreational use. The racial makeup of the town was 96.9% White, 0.1% African American, 0.2% Native American, 0.9% Asian, 0.1% Native Hawaiian or Pacific Islander, 0.1% some other race, and 1.8% from two or more races. 0.3% of the population were Hispanic or Latino of any race.

Of the 624 households, 25.5% had children under the age of 18 living with them, 43.6% were headed by married couples living together, 8.5% had a female householder with no husband present, and 43.4% were non-families. 31.6% of all households were made up of individuals, and 9.2% were someone living alone who was 65 years of age or older. The average household size was 2.20, and the average family size was 2.77.

In the town, 19.2% of the population were under the age of 18, 7.9% were from 18 to 24, 24.2% from 25 to 44, 32.2% from 45 to 64, and 16.4% were 65 years of age or older. The median age was 44.2 years. For every 100 females, there were 102.1 males. For every 100 females age 18 and over, there were 101.5 males.

For the period 2011–2015, the estimated median annual income for a household was $49,063, and the median income for a family was $62,500. Male full-time workers had a median income of $33,750 versus $44,034 for females. The per capita income for the town was $30,671. 8.0% of the population and 2.4% of families were below the poverty line. 7.5% of the population under the age of 18 and 5.0% of those 65 or older were living in poverty.

References

External links
 
 Moosilauke Public Library
 New Hampshire Economic and Labor Market Information Bureau Profile

Towns in Grafton County, New Hampshire
Towns in New Hampshire
Logging communities in the United States